Nazmun Nesa Peyari is a Bangladeshi writer and journalist. In recognition of her contribution in language and literature, the government of Bangladesh awarded her the country's second highest civilian award Ekushey Padak in 2020.

Early life 
Piari holds a master's degree in biochemistry from Dhaka University.  completing her education,  joined the Siddheswari college as a teacher. Later she taught at Eden Women's College for some time. He started writing regularly in newspapers from 1980

Career 
Piari joined DW Bengali division in 1976 as a journalist.  After working in the Bengali department for three years, she also worked in the German and English departments. In 1990, she became the first foreigner to join DW as editor of marketing and public relations. After working in this department in 2003, she moved to Berlin. In 2005, her first translated book, Piano Teacher, was published. It was originally written by Nobel prize winning writer Elfriede Jellinek. As of November 2019, she has translated four books.

References 

Living people
Writers from Dhaka
Bengali writers
Bengali-language writers
Bangladeshi women writers
Recipients of the Ekushey Padak
Year of birth missing (living people)
Bangladeshi women journalists